Brobst Mill is a historic grist mill located in Albany Township, Berks County, Pennsylvania.  It was built about 1780, and is a 2 1/2-story, stone and log mill building. Also on the property is the wheel pit area of the raceway. It was built as part of a larger industrial complex known as Union Iron Works. The mill ceased operation in the 1960s.

It was listed on the National Register of Historic Places in 1990.

References

Grinding mills in Berks County, Pennsylvania
Grinding mills on the National Register of Historic Places in Pennsylvania
Industrial buildings completed in 1780
National Register of Historic Places in Berks County, Pennsylvania